Brice Creek is a  long 3rd order tributary to the Trent River in Craven County, North Carolina.

Course
Brice Creek is formed at the confluence of East Prong and West Prong Brice Creek about 6 miles northwest of Havelock, North Carolina and then flows north-northwest to join the Trent River about 0.5 miles southwest of James City.

Watershed
Brice Creek drains  of area, receives about 55.6 in/year of precipitation, has a wetness index of 631.01, and is about 23% forested.

See also
List of rivers of North Carolina

References

Rivers of North Carolina
Rivers of Craven County, North Carolina